The Skattaboe Block is a historic building in Moscow, Idaho. It was built by Taylor & Lauder for the  Moscow Telephone and Telegraph Company in 1892. It was owned by the Inland Telephone Company from 1925 to 1952, when it was purchased by the  General Telephone Company. It currently houses New Saint Andrews College.

The building was designed in the Romanesque Revival architectural style. Due to a fire in 1966 the building was renovated in 1978, but the original design of the building has been preserved. It has been listed on the National Register of Historic Places since May 22, 1978.

References

National Register of Historic Places in Latah County, Idaho
Romanesque Revival architecture in Idaho
Buildings and structures completed in 1892
Commercial buildings on the National Register of Historic Places in Idaho
Telecommunications buildings on the National Register of Historic Places